Cambala annulata is a species of millipede in the family Cambalidae. It is found in North America.

References

Further reading

 

Spirostreptida
Articles created by Qbugbot
Animals described in 1821